The Drama of the St. Mary's Church Tower (Polish:Dramat Wieży Mariackiej) is a 1913 Polish silent drama film directed by Wiktor Biegański and starring Włodzimierz Kosiński, Helena Górska and Władysław Puchalski. The film was Bieganski's debut as a director. It was filmed in Lviv and Krakow, then part of the Austro-Hungarian Empire. It is likely that the film and Bieganski's next production, The Adventures of Anton, were never put on general release. Elements of the film still survive.

Cast
 Włodzimierz Kosiński as Szmidt
Helena Górska as Ada
Wiktor Biegański as Rudolf
Władysław Puchalski as kamieniarz

References

Bibliography
 Haltof, Marek. Polish National Cinema. Berghahn Books, 2002.
 Skaff, Sheila. The Law of the Looking Glass: Cinema in Poland, 1896–1939. Ohio University Press, 2008.

External links 

 The Drama of the St. Mary's Church Tower on FilmPolski (polish)

1913 films
1913 drama films
Polish drama films
Polish silent films
1910s Polish-language films
Films directed by Wiktor Bieganski
Films shot in Poland
Polish black-and-white films
Silent drama films